This is a list of streams and rivers in Burkina Faso. Burkina Faso has three main rivers — the Black Volta, the Red Volta and the White Volta. Areas near rivers are affected by tsetse flies and simulium flies. This list is arranged  by drainage basin, with respective tributaries indented under each larger stream's name.

Gulf of Guinea

Komoé River
Iringou River
Léraba River
Volta River (Ghana)
Oti River (Pendjari River)
Koulpéolgo River
Black Volta (Mouhoun River)
Bougouriba River
Sourou River
White Volta (Nakambé)
Kulpawn River
Sisili River
Red Volta (Nazinon)
Niger River (Niger)  
Mékrou River
Tapoa River
Goroubi River
Sirba River
Béli River
Bani River (Mali)
Banifing River

References

United Nations, 2004
 GEOnet Names Server

Burkina Faso
Rivers